Imtiyaz Husain is an Indian film writer. He wrote the 2000 film Astitva with Mahesh Manjrekar.

Filmography

As an actor
 Vaastav: The Reality (1999)
 Ghulam-E-Mustafa (1997) as Minister Imtiyaz
 Parinda (1989) as Dara

As a writer
 Annarth (2002) (screenplay and story)
 Astitva (2000) (Hindi dialogues)
 Vaastav: The Reality (1999) (dialogues)
 Ghulam-E-Mustafa (1997) (dialogue and screenplay)
 Is Raat Ki Subah Nahin (1996) (dialogues)
 Stunttman (1994) (dialogues)

External links

Year of birth missing (living people)
Living people
Indian male screenwriters
Indian Muslims
Screenwriters from Tamil Nadu